VMware, Inc. is an American cloud computing and virtualization technology company with headquarters in Palo Alto, California. VMware was the first commercially successful company to virtualize the x86 architecture.

VMware's desktop software runs on Microsoft Windows, Linux, and macOS. VMware ESXi, its enterprise software hypervisor, is an operating system that runs on server hardware.

In May 2022, Broadcom Inc. announced an agreement to acquire VMware in a cash-and-stock transaction valued at $61 billion.

History

Early history 
In 1998, VMware was founded by Diane Greene, Mendel Rosenblum, Scott Devine, Edward Wang and Edouard Bugnion. Greene and Rosenblum were both graduate students at the University of California, Berkeley. Edouard Bugnion remained the chief architect and CTO of VMware until 2005, and went on to found Nuova Systems (now part of Cisco). For the first year, VMware operated in stealth mode, with roughly 20 employees by the end of 1998. The company was launched officially early in the second year, in February 1999, at the DEMO Conference organized by Chris Shipley. The first product, VMware Workstation, was delivered in May 1999, and the company entered the server market in 2001 with VMware GSX Server (hosted) and VMware ESX Server (hostless).

In 2003, VMware launched VMware Virtual Center, vMotion, and Virtual Symmetric Multi-Processing (SMP) technology. 64-bit support was introduced in 2004.

EMC acquisition 
On January 9, 2004, under the terms of the definitive agreement announced on December 15, 2003, EMC (now Dell EMC) acquired the company with $625 million in cash. On August 14, 2007, EMC sold 15% of VMware to the public via an initial public offering.

On July 8, 2008, after disappointing financial performance, the board of directors fired VMware co-founder, president and CEO Diane Greene, who was replaced by Paul Maritz, a retired 14-year Microsoft veteran who was heading EMC's cloud computing business unit. Greene had been CEO since the company's founding, ten years earlier. On September 10, 2008, Mendel Rosenblum, the company's co-founder, chief scientist, and the husband of Diane Greene, resigned.

On September 16, 2008, VMware announced a collaboration with Cisco Systems. One result was the Cisco Nexus 1000V, a distributed virtual software switch, an integrated option in the VMware infrastructure.

In April 2011, EMC transferred control of the Mozy backup service to VMware.

On April 12, 2011, VMware released an open-source platform-as-a-service system called Cloud Foundry, as well as a hosted version of the service. This supported application deployment for Java, Ruby on Rails, Sinatra, Node.js, and Scala, as well as database support for MySQL, MongoDB, Redis, Postgres, RabbitMQ.

In August 2012, Pat Gelsinger was appointed as the new CEO of VMware, coming over from EMC. Paul Maritz went over to EMC as Head of Strategy before moving on to lead the Pivotal spin-off.

In March 2013, VMware announced the corporate spin-off of Pivotal Software, with General Electric making an investment in the company. All of VMware's application- and developer-oriented products, including Spring, tc Server, Cloud Foundry, RabbitMQ, GemFire, and SQLFire were transferred to this organization.

In May 2013, VMware launched its own IaaS service, vCloud Hybrid Service, at its new Palo Alto headquarters (vCloud Hybrid Service was rebranded vCloud Air and subsequently sold to cloud provider OVH), announcing an early access program in a Las Vegas data center. The service is designed to function as an extension of its customer's existing vSphere installations, with full compatibility with existing virtual machines virtualized with VMware software and tightly integrated networking. The service is based on vCloud Director 5.1/vSphere 5.1.

In September 2013, at VMworld San Francisco, VMware announced the general availability of vCloud Hybrid Service and expansion to Sterling, Virginia, Santa Clara, California, Dallas, Texas, and a service beta in the UK. It announced the acquisition Desktone in October 2013.

Dell acquisition 
In January 2016, in anticipation of Dell's acquisition of EMC, VMware announced a restructuring to reduce about 800 positions, and some executives resigned. The entire development team behind VMware Workstation and Fusion was disbanded and all US developers were immediately fired. On April 24, 2016, maintenance release 12.1.1 was released. On September 8, 2016, VMware announced the release of Workstation 12.5 and Fusion 8.5 as a free upgrade supporting Windows 10 and Windows Server 2016.

In April 2016, VMware president and COO Carl Eschenbach left VMware to join Sequoia Capital, and Martin Casado, VMware's general manager for its Networking and Security business, left to join Andreessen Horowitz. Analysts commented that the cultures at Dell and EMC, and at EMC and VMware, are different, and said that they had heard that impending corporate cultural collisions and potentially radical product overlap pruning, would cause many EMC and VMware personnel to leave; VMware CEO Pat Gelsinger, following rumors, categorically denied that he would leave.

In August 2016 VMware introduced the VMware Cloud Provider website.

Mozy was transferred to Dell in 2016 after the merger of Dell and EMC.

In April 2017, according to Glassdoor, VMware was ranked 3rd on the list of highest paying companies in the United States.

In Q2 2017, VMware sold vCloud Air to French cloud service provider OVH.

On January 13, 2021, VMware announced that CEO Pat Gelsinger would be leaving to step in at Intel.  Intel is where Gelsinger spent 30 years of his career and was Intel's first chief technology officer. CFO Zane Rowe became interim CEO while the board searched for a replacement.

On April 15, 2021, it was reported that Dell would spin off its remaining stake in VMware to shareholders and that the two companies would continue to operate without major changes for at least five years. The spinoff was completed on November 1, 2021.

On May 12, 2021, VMware announced that Raghu Raghuram would take over as CEO.

In May 2022, VMware announced that the company had partnered with Formula One motor racing team, McLaren Racing.

Broadcom acquisition 
On May 26, 2022, it was announced that Broadcom will acquire VMware for approximately $61 billion in cash and stock in addition to assuming $8 billion of VMware's net debt, and that Broadcom Software Group would rebrand and operate as VMware. The transaction is expected to close during Broadcom’s fiscal year 2023. In November 2022, the UK's Competition and Markets Authority regulator announced it would investigate whether the Broadcom Inc. acquisition of VMware Inc. would "result in a substantial lessening of competition within any market or markets in the United Kingdom for goods or services".

Log4Shell vulnerability 
Beginning in January 2022, hackers infiltrated servers using the Log4Shell vulnerability at organizations who failed to implement available patches released by VMware according to PCMag. ZDNet reported in March 2022 that hackers utilized Log4Shell on some customers' VMware servers to install backdoors and for cryptocurrency mining. In May 2022, Bleeping Computer reported that the Lazarus Group cybercrime group, which is possibly linked to North Korea, was actively using Log4Shell "to inject backdoors that fetch information-stealing payloads on VMware Horizon servers", including VMware Horizon.

Acquisitions

Litigation
In March 2015, the Software Freedom Conservancy announced it was funding litigation by Christoph Hellwig in Hamburg, Germany against VMware for alleged violation of his copyrights in its ESXi product.
Hellwig's core claim is that ESXi is a derivative work of the GPLv2-licensed Linux kernel 2.4, and therefore VMware is not in compliance
with GPLv2 because it does not publish the source code to ESXi. VMware publicly stated that ESXi is not a derivative of the Linux kernel, denying Hellwig's
core claim. VMware said it offered a way to use Linux device drivers with ESXi, and that code does use some Linux GPLv2-licensed code and so it had published the source, meeting GPLv2 requirements.

The lawsuit was dismissed by the court in July 2016 and Hellwig announced he would file an appeal. The appeal was decided February 2019 and again dismissed by German court, on the basis of not meeting "procedural requirements for the burden of proof of the plaintiff."

Current products
VMware's most notable products are its hypervisors. VMware became well known for its first type 2 hypervisor known as GSX. This product has since evolved into two hypervisor product lines: VMware's type 1 hypervisors running directly on hardware and their hosted type 2 hypervisors.

VMware software provides a completely virtualized set of hardware to the guest operating system. VMware software virtualizes the hardware for a video adapter, a network adapter, and hard disk adapters. The host provides pass-through drivers for guest USB, serial, and parallel devices. In this way, VMware virtual machines become highly portable between computers, because every host looks nearly identical to the guest. In practice, a system administrator can pause operations on a virtual machine guest, move or copy that guest to another physical computer, and there resume execution exactly at the point of suspension. Alternatively, for enterprise servers, a feature called vMotion allows the migration of operational guest virtual machines between similar but separate hardware hosts sharing the same storage (or, with vMotion Storage, separate storage can be used, too). Each of these transitions is completely transparent to any users on the virtual machine at the time it is being migrated.

VMware's products predate the virtualization extensions to the x86 instruction set, and do not require virtualization-enabled processors. On newer processors, the hypervisor is now designed to take advantage of the extensions. However, unlike many other hypervisors, VMware still supports older processors. In such cases, it uses the CPU to run code directly whenever possible (as, for example, when running user-mode and virtual 8086 mode code on x86). When direct execution cannot operate, such as with kernel-level and real-mode code, VMware products use binary translation (BT) to re-write the code dynamically. The translated code gets stored in spare memory, typically at the end of the address space, which segmentation mechanisms can protect and make invisible. For these reasons, VMware operates dramatically faster than emulators, running at more than 80% of the speed that the virtual guest operating system would run directly on the same hardware. In one study VMware claims a slowdown over native ranging from 0–6 percent for the VMware ESX Server.

Desktop software
 VMware Workstation, introduced in 1999, was the first product launched by VMware. This software suite allows users to run multiple instances of x86 or x86-64-compatible operating systems on a single physical personal computer. The current version, 17.0, was released in November 17, 2022.
 VMware Fusion provides similar functionality for users of the Intel Mac platform, along with full compatibility with virtual machines created by other VMware products.
 VMware Workstation Player is freeware for non-commercial use, without requiring a license, and available for commercial use with permission. It is similar to VMware Workstation, with reduced functionality, such as "UEFI Secure Boot Support".

Server software
VMware ESXi, an enterprise software product, can deliver greater performance than the freeware VMware Server, due to lower system computational overhead. VMware ESXi, as a "bare-metal" product, runs directly on the server hardware, allowing virtual servers to also use hardware more or less directly. In addition, VMware ESXi integrates into VMware vCenter, which offers extra services.

Cloud management software 
 VMware  Suite – a cloud management platform purpose-built for a hybrid cloud.
 VMware Go is a web-based service to guide users of any expertise level through the installation and configuration of VMware vSphere Hypervisor.
 VMware Cloud Foundation – Cloud Foundation provides an easy way to deploy and operate a private cloud on an integrated SDDC system.
 VMware Horizon View is a virtual desktop infrastructure (VDI) product.
 vSphere+ and vSAN+ – activates add-on hybrid cloud services for business-critical applications running on-premises, including disaster recovery and ransomware protection

Application management
The VMware Workspace Portal was a self-service app store for workspace management.

Storage and availability
VMware's storage and availability products are composed of two primary offerings:

 VMware vSAN (previously called VMware Virtual SAN) is software-defined storage that is embedded in VMware's ESXi hypervisor. The vSphere and vSAN software runs on industry-standard x86 servers to form a hyper-converged infrastructure (or HCI). However, network operators need to have servers from HCL (Hardware Compatibility List) to put one into production. The first release, version 5.5, was released in March 2014. The 6th generation, version 6.6, was released in April 2017. New features available in VMware vSAN 6.6 include native data at rest encryption, local protection for stretched clusters, analytics, and optimized solid-state drive performance. The VMWare 6.7 version was released in April 2018, Users now have improved monitoring tools and new workflows, it is closer to feature parity. The vCenter Server Appliance architecture is moving around to an easy deployment method.
 VMware Site Recovery Manager (SRM) automates the failover and failback of virtual machines to and from a secondary site using policy-based management.

Networking and security products
 VMware NSX is VMware's network virtualization product marketed using the term software-defined data center (SDDC). The technology included some acquired from the 2012 purchase of Nicira. Software Defined Networking (SDN) allows the same policies that govern Identity and Access Management (IAM) to dictate levels of access to applications and data through a totally converged infrastructure not possible with legacy network and system access methods.

Other products
 Workspace ONE allows mobile users to access apps and data.
 The VIX (Virtual Infrastructure eXtension) API allows automated or scripted management of a computer virtualized using either VMware's vSphere, Workstation, Player, or Fusion products. VIX provides bindings for the programming languages C, Perl, Visual Basic, VBScript and C#.
 Herald is a communications protocol from VMware for more reliable Bluetooth communication and range finding for mobile devices. Herald code is available under an open-source license and was implemented in the Australian Government's COVIDSafe app for contact tracing on 19 December 2020.

See also
 Comparison of platform virtualization software
 Hardware virtualization
 Hypervisor
 VMware VMFS

References

External links
 

 
1998 establishments in California
2007 initial public offerings
American companies established in 1998
Announced information technology acquisitions
Cloud computing providers
Companies based in Palo Alto, California
Companies listed on the New York Stock Exchange
Dell EMC
Software companies based in the San Francisco Bay Area
Software companies established in 1998
Software companies of the United States